Donat G. Wentzel (June 25, 1934 – February 20, 2013)  was an American astrophysicist, best known as astronomy educator of undergraduates, graduates, and young researchers.
A graduate of the University of Chicago, he established himself in plasma astrophysics, working on cosmic magnetism and electrical currents flowing both between the stars and on the Sun. His outstanding contribution was on Alfven waves driven by cosmic rays and the emission processes of solar flares at radio waves. His book on the “Restless Sun,”  written for undergraduates, was named Book of the Year by the Astronomical Society of the Pacific in 1989. Wentzel received 2003 the George Van Biesbroeck Prize. His nomination reads: "For outstanding and sustained contributions during three decades to astronomy education in this country."

Life and education
Donat Wentzel was born in Zurich, Switzerland, as the only child of Anny and Gregor Wentzel. In 1948 the family moved to Chicago, where Donat Wentzel received the rest of his schooling up to the Ph.D. 1959 he married Maria Mayer, the daughter of Maria Goeppert Mayer. They are survived by one daughter.

Teaching
Wentzel developed an astronomy course for college students who would not be majoring in a science.  This course at one time attracted over 3000 students per year at the University of Maryland.  As part of this course, he developed student activities based on astronomical photographs.  He stimulated  similar courses nationally and internationally, supporting the teaching of astronomy as a medium for science education in scientifically developing countries. On behalf of the International Astronomical Union, he organized and/or participated as faculty of  eight International Schools for Young Astronomers, supervised  a visiting-lecturer program in Peru and Paraguay, and helped to develop astronomy in China, Egypt, India, Indonesia, Vietnam, Iran, Vietnam, Morocco, Central America, Malaysia, Romania, Sri Lanka, and the Philippines. In 1975 Wentzel received the Teaching of Science award by the Washington Academy of Sciences.

References

1934 births
2013 deaths
American astrophysicists
University of Chicago alumni
University of Maryland, College Park faculty
Swiss emigrants to the United States